Saban's Gulliver's Travels (also known as simply Gulliver's Travels) is a French animated series that aired from September 8, 1992, to June 29, 1993.

Presented by France 2 and Saban International Paris, with the participation of Canal+ and the C.N.C, the series is a loose adaptation of the 1726 satirical novel Gulliver's Travels by Jonathan Swift, and spanned a total of 26 episodes.

Ownership of the series passed to Disney in 2001 when Disney acquired Fox Kids Worldwide, which also includes Saban Entertainment. The series is not available on Disney+.

Plot 
The series follows the fortunes of sailor Dr. Lemuel Gulliver who decided to explore the whole world. During his travel Gulliver meets a race of small people called the "Lilliputians". Gulliver is accompanied by Dr. Flim, his wife Fosla, her daughter Folia and best friend Raphael. Together experiencing amazing and fantastic adventures.

Characters 
 Dr. Lemuel Gulliver (Voiced by Terrence Scammell) – The main protagonist of the show. Sailor who decided to explore the whole world.
 Raphael (Voiced by Daniel Brochu) – Gulliver's assistant and best friend.
 Dr. Flim (Voiced by A.J. Henderson) – A doctor and Fosla's husband.
 Fosla (Voiced by Sonja Ball) – Dr. Flim's wife.
 Folia (Voiced by Jessalyn Gilsig) – A daughter of Fosla and Dr. Flim.

Episodes list

References

External links 

 Saban’s Gulliver’s Travels in Planete-Jeunesse

Gulliver's Travels
1992 French television series debuts
1993 French television series endings
1990s French animated television series
French children's animated adventure television series
English-language television shows
French-language television shows
Television series by Saban Entertainment